Ilya Mikhailovich Bobryshov (born 22 July 1997) is a Russian football player. He plays for FC Avangard Kursk.

Club career
He made his debut in the Russian Football National League for FC Avangard Kursk on 12 May 2018 in a game against FC Olimpiyets Nizhny Novgorod.

References

External links
 Profile by Russian Football National League

1997 births
Sportspeople from Kursk
Living people
Russian footballers
Association football defenders
FC Khimik-Arsenal players
FC Avangard Kursk players